Over the course of more than five decades, the American experimental filmmaker Stan Brakhage produced a large body of work. All films in the filmography are assumed to be silent, in color, and are meant to be shown at 24 frames per second, unless otherwise noted. The Brakhage films, comprising his edited originals, intermediate elements, and other original material, are housed at the Academy of Motion Picture Arts and Sciences Film Archive, where a long-term project is underway to preserve and restore his entire film output.

Fifty-six of these films are available on DVD (as two separate volumes) and Blu-ray from the Criterion Collection.



1950s
Notes
 During the late 1950s, Brakhage worked on several industrial films, many of them for the city of Pittsburgh.

1960s

Industrial films and other works
In the early 1960s, Brakhage directed several industrial and educational films, including two for the state of Colorado. He also directed commercials for Rural Electric of Dakota. In 1969, Brakhage served as cinematographer on the short film Nuptiae, directed by James Broughton.

1970s

Other missing works
Around 1979, Brakhage produced as many as five films using the Polavision developed by Polaroid. These films are estimated to have been about  minutes each in length. Their present whereabouts are unknown.

1980s

1990s

2000s

References

External links
 

Films directed by Stan Brakhage
Director filmographies
American filmographies